Uppalapati Narayana Rao is an Indian director, screenwriter, scriptwriter, and actor. He is primarily known for his work in Telugu cinema and Telugu TV. He directed and produced multiple feature films and TV programmes across different genres, including film and theatre, and is known for his creativity, screenplay, technical values, and story writing. He is the vice president of content at Introupe Productions LLP, Hyderabad.

He started his career as a theatre actor / director in 1979 and then moved to South Indian feature films in 1985. He assisted well known and celebrated South Indian directors such as Ramana Babu, Hari Anumolu, Balu Mahendra, Vamsy and Mohana Gandhi for movies such as Kartavyam, Maharshi, Varasudochhadu during 1985 to 1990. He then debuted as a film director with the Telugu movie Jaitra Yatra starring Nagarjuna and Vijayashanthi in late 1990. Since his directorial debut, he has been in the South Indian industry writing, directing, and acting in Telugu feature films.

He is also known for his contributions to the South Indian TV content production for channels like ETV, Gemini, MAA and Doordarshan. He also worked with Balaji Telefilms as the creative head for South Indian content for two years (2010-2012) helping with curation and production of Telugu TV content / programmes.

Image gallery

Nandi Awards gallery 
He won Nandi Awards from Andhra Pradesh Government for his film Myna (Best Screenplay) and TV series Vasantha Kokila (Best Director and Story), Gruhapravesham (Best Director) and ETV Mega Serial Priyanka (Best TV Serial). His most recent feature film project as director was titled Gnaapakam (2007).

Filmography
Movies

Theatre

 TV

References

Telugu film directors
Film directors from Andhra Pradesh
Indian experimental filmmakers
Living people
1958 births
Nandi Award winners
Screenwriters from Andhra Pradesh
Indian male screenwriters
20th-century Indian film directors
People from Kakinada
Film producers from Andhra Pradesh